Hypotia bertazii is a species of snout moth in the genus Hypotia. It was described by Turati in 1926, and is known from Libya.

References

Moths described in 1926
Hypotiini
Endemic fauna of Libya
Moths of Africa